The Spektator is a former English-language magazine published in Kyrgyzstan.

The magazine was published between October 2008 and June 2013 by Gwladys Street Publishing, a British owned company registered in Kyrgyzstan, and covered social and cultural issues in Kyrgyzstan and the wider Central Asian region. It also featured a city guide to Bishkek, the capital city of Kyrgyzstan.

Its target readership included Kyrgyzstanis with a good command of English, students at universities, foreign companies established in Kyrgyzstan, as well as foreigners who were either living and working in Kyrgyzstan or were preparing to do so.

References

External links
 Official website

2007 establishments in Kyrgyzstan
News magazines published in Asia
English-language magazines
Free magazines
Local interest magazines
Magazines established in 2007
Mass media in Bishkek
Monthly magazines